This is a list of VTV dramas released in 2017. 

←2016 - 2017 - 2018→

VTV Special Tet dramas
These dramas air on VTV1 in the time of Lunar New Year. The 4-episodes drama airs from 3rd to 6th Tet holiday, from 20:10 to 20:55.

VTV1 Weeknight Prime-time dramas

Monday-Wednesday dramas
These dramas air from 20:45 to 21:30, Monday to Wednesday on VTV1. Only Nơi ẩn nấp bình yên was aired on Monday and Tuesday.

Thursday-Friday dramas
These dramas air from 20:45 to 21:30, Thursday and Friday on VTV1. Only Sống chung với mẹ chồng was aired on Wednesday to Friday due to audience's positive effect.

VTV3 Weeknight Prime-time dramas

First line-up
New time slot  on VTV3. These dramas air from 20:00 to 20:30, Monday to Thursday.

Second line-up

Monday-Tuesday dramas
These dramas air from 21:40 to 22:30, Monday and Tuesday on VTV3.

Wednesday–Thursday dramas
These dramas air from 21:40 to 22:30, Wednesday and Thursday on VTV3.

{| class="wikitable sortable"
! style="width:10%;"| Broadcast
! style="width:24%;"| Title
! style="width:6%;"| Eps.
! style="width:5%;"| Prod.
! style="width:25%;"| Cast and crew
! style="width:20%;"| Theme song(s)
! style="width:5%;"| Genre
! style="width:5%;"| Notes
|----- bgcolor="#ebf5ff"
| style="text-align:center;" |23 Mar-31 Aug<small>Prequel: 21&28 May4&9 Jun(on vtvgiaitri)</small> 
| Người phán xử (The Arbitrator)
| style="text-align:center;" | 47+4
| style="text-align:center;" | VFC
| Nguyễn Mai Hiền, Nguyễn Khải Anh, Nguyễn Danh Dũng (directors); Nguyễn Trung Dũng, Khánh Bùi (writers); Hoàng Dũng, Việt Anh, Hồng Đăng, Trung Anh, Chu Hùng, Bảo Anh, Doãn Quốc Đam, Thanh Quý, Quốc Trọng, Đan Lê, Lưu Đê Ly, Thùy Dương, Bảo Thanh, Vũ Thu Hoài, Thanh Hương, Anh Đức, Trọng Hùng, Danh Thái, Thanh Bi, Thúy An, Đỗ Kỷ... (Prequel: Vân Dung, Tạ Minh Thảo, Thanh Sơn, Tùng Dương, Anh Tuấn)
| 
| Crime, Drama
| Based on Israeli series Ha-Borer (Hot Channel 3 2007).25 min/1 prequel episode.
|-
| style="text-align:center;" |6 Sep-7 Dec 
| Ghét thì yêu thôi (I Love You Because I Hate You)
| style="text-align:center;" | 28
| style="text-align:center;" | VFC
| Trịnh Lê Phong (director); Lê Huyền, Trần Diệu Linh (writers); Lê Phương Anh, Đình Tú, Chí Trung, Vân Dung, Hoàng Thu Trang, Danh Tùng, Ngọc Dũng, Tùng Lan, Hải Anh, Mạnh Hưng, Trần Đức, Ngọc Quỳnh, Vũ Thu Hoài...
| Ghét thì yêu thôi (I Love You Because I Hate You)Càng ghét càng yêu (More Hate, More Love)by My My & Sơn Việt
| Comedy, Romance
| 
|----- bgcolor="#ebf5ff"
| style="text-align:center;" |13 Dec 2017-23 Aug 2018Crossover with 'Người phán xử' & 'Phía trước là bầu trời':11 May 2018Extra Story:23 Aug 2018(on vtvgiaitri)
| Cả một đời ân oán (Life of Love and Feud)
| style="text-align:center;" | 72+2Pt.1: 34ePt.2: 38e
| style="text-align:center;" | VFC
| Trọng Trinh, Vũ Trường Khoa, Bùi Tiến Huy (directors); Phạm Phương Thảo, Hoàng Hồng Hạnh, Nguyễn Thu Trang (writers); Mạnh Cường, Mỹ Uyên, Mạnh Trường, Hồng Diễm, Hồng Đăng, Lan Phương, Thanh Sơn, Đan Lê, Thiện Tùng, Huỳnh Anh, Hạ Anh, Phạm Anh Tuấn, Lương Thanh, Kiên Hoàng, Thùy Anh, Trọng Lân, Minh Phương, Thanh Quý, Đình Tú, Minh Vượng, Anh Thơ, Kiều My, Phan Thắng, Hằng Nga, Trần Đức, Phương Lâm...
| Khi tình yêu bắt đầu (When Love Begins)by Khánh LinhChờ yêu (Await Love)by Kim ThànhCả một đời yêu thương (In Love For Life)by Minh Vương M4U
| Drama, Family, Romance
| Based on Taiwanese drama Noble Bride: Regretless Love .First project with both 4K filming and synchronous recording.
|}

VTV3 Rubic 8 dramas
These dramas air from 14:20 to 15:10, Saturday and Sunday on VTV3 as a part of the program Rubic 8''. The time slot was closed after this year.

VTV6 Weeknight dramas
The time slot was opened only in 2017 to release warehoused Vietnamese dramas. It was preceded and followed by foreign dramas.

These dramas air from 21:00 to 21:45, Monday to Friday on VTV6.

Non-recurring dramas
These dramas was warehoused and now released on VTV channels in the time slot that's originally made for another program or playback dramas.

See also
 List of dramas broadcast by Vietnam Television (VTV)
 List of dramas broadcast by Hanoi Radio Television (HanoiTV)
 List of dramas broadcast by Vietnam Digital Television (VTC)
List of television programmes broadcast by Vietnam Television (VTV)

References

External links
VTV.gov.vn – Official VTV Website 
VTV.vn – Official VTV Online Newspaper 

Vietnam Television original programming
2017 in Vietnamese television